The Tony Award for Best Play (formally, the Antoinette Perry Award for Excellence in Theatre) is an annual award given to the best new (non-musical) play on Broadway, as determined by Tony Award voters. There was no award in the Tonys' first year. The award goes to the authors and the producers of the play. Plays that have appeared in previous Broadway productions are instead eligible for Best Revival of a Play.

Award winners
Legend:

1940s

1950s

1960s

1970s

1980s

1990s

2000s

2010s

2020s

Award records

Multiple awards and nominations

Superlatives
British writer Tom Stoppard has won this award four times, more than any other playwright. Only seven other writers (Arthur Miller, Terrence McNally, Tony Kushner, Edward Albee, Neil Simon, Yasmina Reza and Peter Shaffer) have won the award more than once, each winning twice.

With ten nominations, Neil Simon has been nominated for the award more than any other playwright. August Wilson, with nine nominations, comes in second, followed by Tom Stoppard (seven nominations), Edward Albee (six nominations), Arthur Miller (five nominations), and Martin McDonagh (five nominations).

In 1994, Tony Kushner became the first playwright to win consecutive Tony Awards for his two-part Angels in America: A Gay Fantasia on National Themes.  Terrence McNally repeated this feat the following two years with his plays Love! Valour! Compassion! and Master Class.

See also
 Tony Award for Best Revival of a Play
 Drama Desk Award for Outstanding Play
 Laurence Olivier Award for Best New Play
 List of Tony Award and Olivier Award winning plays

References

External links
 The American Theatre Wing's Tony Awards official website

Tony Awards
Awards established in 1948
1948 establishments in the United States